Tim Hiller (born December 13, 1986) is a former American football quarterback. He played college football at Western Michigan. He was signed by the Indianapolis Colts as an undrafted free agent in 2010. After his playing days, Hiller worked as head football coach at Gull Lake High School in Richland, Michigan.

Early years
Hiller threw for 7,222 career yards and 55 touchdowns. He holds six school passing records as quarterback at Orrville High School in Orrville, Ohio.  He was named Akron Beacon Journal Player of the Year.

College career

2005 season
Hiller appeared in seven games as a true freshman and was named MAC Freshman of the Year.  He made his first collegiate start at Bowling Green and threw three TD passes.  He also threw a career-long 89-yard touchdown pass to Greg Jennings against Bowling Green.

2006 season
Hiller spent the year redshirted due to an injury.

2007 season
Hiller started all 12 games and became the second Bronco quarterback to throw for over 3,000 yards in a single season.  He became the fourth Bronco quarterback to throw over 40 touchdowns in his career, and he finished the years with a 63.4 completion percentage.  He also booted his first career punt for 14 yards.  Hiller was also named Academic All-MAC.

2008 season

Hiller caught national attention in his junior season.  He broke WMU single-season records for passing attempts (522), completions (339), yards (3,725) and touchdowns (36).  Hiller also led the MAC in five of six major passing categories (attempts, completions, yards, yards per game, and touchdowns)  He became just the second Bronco to throw for over 3,000 yards in a season twice in a career.  He threw for multiple touchdowns in all but two games and threw for over 300 yards in seven games.  Hiller also set the record for passing yardage (471) at Kelly/Shorts Stadium in a 38–28 loss to Central Michigan on October 18, 2008.  He also threw two touchdown passes in the 2008 Texas Bowl loss to Rice.

2009 season

Hiller threw for 3,249 yards and 23 touchdowns and finished the year with a passer efficiency rating of 122.9 as the Broncos struggled at times during the year and finished 5-7, including blow-out losses to Michigan and Michigan State.  Hiller was 40-of-66 passing for 410 yards on October 17 against rival Central Michigan, but the Broncos couldn't keep pace with the Chippewas, falling, 34-23.  Hiller's last game in Waldo Stadium against Ball State on November 24 was unceremoniously marked by four interceptions as the Broncos lost, 22-17, to the Cardinals, despite Hiller completing 33-of-62 passes for 354 yards and a score.  Prior to start of 2009 season, in June 2009, Hiller was #5 on list of top senior college quarterback prospects by NFL.com.  Hiller was also named to the 2009 Manning Award watchlist.

At the conclusion of the season, Hiller received the Wuerffel Trophy and the John S. Pingel Award as the Michigan Division I college scholar-athlete of the year.  He was also a finalist for the William V. Campbell Trophy.

Professional career
Hiller trained for the 2010 NFL Combine at The Home Depot Center in Carson, California. He signed a contract with the Indianapolis Colts as an undrafted-rookie, 12 hours after the draft. Hiller played in one preseason game before being waived by the Colts on August 23, 2010.

Coaching career
Having a shortage of coaches in the fall of 2010, Tim Hiller agreed to coach at Vicksburg High School alongside former teammate Scott Gajos, a former physical education intern at Vicksburg Community High School. With Hiller filling the role of a quarterback coach, helped the Bulldogs secure playoff rights for the first time in 17 years. After a single year Tim decided to rise from an assistant coach to new Head coach at Gull Lake High School

Former Gull Lake High School coach Mark Blaesser was fired on November 22, 2010 and he went 34-23 in six seasons.  Hiller was announced as the new varsity football coach at Gull Lake High School on February 1, 2011 and will patrol the sidelines in the fall.

Personal
Hiller completed his undergraduate degree in business, majoring in sales & marketing in August, 2008 and is currently pursuing his MBA.  He also has carried a 4.0 GPA his entire academic career.

References

External links
 

1986 births
Living people
American football quarterbacks
Indianapolis Colts players
Western Michigan Broncos football players
High school football coaches in Michigan
People from Parma, Ohio
Players of American football from Ohio